Madan Lal Sharma (22 April 1952 – 23 December 2020) represented Jammu Loksabha in the 14th Lok Sabha & 15th Lok Sabha of India. He represented the Jammu-Poonch Loksabha constituency of Jammu and Kashmir twice in the Indian Parliament and was a member of the Indian National Congress (INC) political party. He also contested the 2014 Loksabha Elections on Congress ticket but was defeated by the BJP candidate Jugal Kishore Sharma.

He died in 2020 after testing positive for COVID-19.

References

External links
 Official biographical sketch in Parliament of India website

1952 births
2020 deaths
Indian National Congress politicians
India MPs 2004–2009
India MPs 2009–2014
People from Jammu (city)
Lok Sabha members from Jammu and Kashmir
Politicians from Jammu
Deaths from the COVID-19 pandemic in India